The 2018–19 CAF Champions League qualifying rounds were played from 27 November to 23 December 2018. A total of 56 teams competed in the qualifying rounds to decide 15 of the 16 places in the group stage of the 2018–19 CAF Champions League.

Draw

The draw for the preliminary round and first round was held on 3 November 2018 in Rabat, Morocco, and was officially announced by the CAF on 9 November due to a special situation with the transitional calendar.

The entry round of the 56 teams entered into the draw was determined by their performances in the CAF competitions for the previous five seasons (CAF 5-Year Ranking points shown in parentheses).

Format

In the qualifying rounds, each tie was played on a home-and-away two-legged basis. If the aggregate score was tied after the second leg, the away goals rule would be applied, and if still tied, extra time would not be played, and the penalty shoot-out would be used to determine the winner (Regulations III. 13 & 14).

Schedule
The schedule of each round was as follows (matches scheduled in midweek in italics).

Bracket
The bracket of the draw was announced by the CAF on 9 November 2018.

The 15 winners of the first round advanced to the group stage to join Espérance de Tunis, who received a bye to the group stage as the title holders, while the 15 losers of the first round entered the Confederation Cup play-off round.

Preliminary round
The preliminary round included the 54 teams that did not receive byes to the first round.

1–1 on aggregate. ASC Diaraf won 4–2 on penalties.

JS Saoura won 2–0 on aggregate.

Ittihad Tanger won 1–0 on aggregate.

Ismaily won 3–1 on aggregate.

4–4 on aggregate. Coton Sport won 5–3 on penalties.

ZESCO United won 5–1 on aggregate.

Orlando Pirates won 8–2 on aggregate.

African Stars won 2–1 on aggregate.

Al-Ahly Benghazi won 3–2 on aggregate.

Mamelodi Sundowns won 7–1 on aggregate.

1–1 on aggregate. Gor Mahia won 4–3 on penalties.

Lobi Stars won 2–1 on aggregate.

Nkana won 3–1 on aggregate.

Simba won 8–1 on aggregate.

Jimma Aba Jifar won 5–3 on aggregate.

CS Constantine won 1–0 on aggregate.

2–2 on aggregate. Vipers won on away goals.

Stade Malien won 5–0 on aggregate.

ASEC Mimosas won 1–0 on aggregate.

2–2 on aggregate. Bantu won 4–2 on penalties.

Club Africain won 3–1 on aggregate.

Al-Hilal won 6–0 on aggregate.

Al-Nasr won 9–3 on aggregate.

Horoya won 2–0 on aggregate.

4–4 on aggregate. AS Otohô won on away goals.

FC Platinum won 2–1 on aggregate.

First round
The first round included 30 teams: the 4 teams that received byes to this round, and the 26 winners of the preliminary round.

3–3 on aggregate. Wydad AC won on away goals.

JS Saoura won 2–1 on aggregate.

Ismaily won 3–2 on aggregate.

TP Mazembe won 2–1 on aggregate.

Orlando Pirates won 1–0 on aggregate.

Mamelodi Sundowns won 4–0 on aggregate.

3–3 on aggregate. Lobi Stars won on away goals.

Simba won 4–3 on aggregate.

Al-Ahly won 2–1 on aggregate.

CS Constantine won 3–0 on aggregate.

ASEC Mimosas won 2–0 on aggregate.

AS Vita Club won 5–2 on aggregate.

Club Africain won 3–2 on aggregate.

Horoya won 6–5 on aggregate.

1–1 on aggregate. FC Platinum won on away goals.

Notes

References

External links
Total CAF Champions League 2018/2019, CAFonline.com

1
November 2018 sports events in Africa
December 2018 sports events in Africa